The GMC CCKW, also known as "Jimmy", or the  by its Ordnance Supply Catalog nr, was a highly successful series of off-road capable, 2-ton, 6×6 trucks, built in large numbers to a standardized design (from 1941 to 1945) for the U.S. Army, that saw heavy service, predominantly as cargo trucks, in both World War II and the Korean War. The original "Deuce and a Half", it formed the backbone of the famed Red Ball Express that kept Allied armies supplied as they pushed eastward after the Normandy invasion.

The CCKW came in many variants, including open or closed cab, long wheelbase (LWB) CCKW-353 and short (SWB) CCKW-352, and over a score of specialized models, but the bulk were standard, general purpose, cargo models. A large minority were built with a front mounted winch, and one in four of the cabs had a machine-gun mounting ring above the co-driver's position.

Of the almost 2.4 million trucks that the U.S. Army bought between 1939 and December 1945, across all payload weight classes, some 812,000, or just over one third, were -ton trucks. GMC's total production of the CCKW and its variants, including the 2-ton, 6x6, amphibian DUKW, and the 6×4, 5-ton (on-road) CCW-353, amounted to some 572,500 units – almost a quarter of the total WW II U.S. truck production, and 70 percent of the total -ton trucks. GMC's total of ~550,000 purely 6×6 models, including the DUKW, formed the overwhelming majority of the ~675,000 six by six -ton trucks, and came in less than 100,000 shy of the almost 650,000 World War II jeeps. Additionally, GM built over 150,000 units of the CCKW's smaller brother, the -ton, 4×4 Chevrolet G506, at the same factory.

The GMC CCKW began to be phased out, once the M35 series trucks were first deployed in the 1950s, but remained in active U.S. service until the mid-1960s. Eventually, the M35 series, originally developed by REO Motors, succeeded the CCKW as the U.S. Army's standard -ton, 6×6 cargo truck.

Etymology
The name CCKW comes from GMC model nomenclature:
"C", designed in 1941
"C", conventional cab
"K", all-wheel drive
"W", dual rear axles
"X", experimental chassis / non-standard wheelbase (first 13,188 units )

History
In 1939-1940 the US Army Ordnance Corps was developing  load-rated 6×6 tactical trucks that could operate off-road in all weather. General Motors, already supplying modified commercial trucks to the Army, modified the 1939 ACKWXbuilt for the French Armyinto the CCKW. The General Motors design was chosen by the Army and went into production at GM'S Yellow Truck and Coach division's Pontiac, Michigan plant alongside 6×4 CCWs. Later they were also manufactured at GM's St. Louis, Missouri Chevrolet plant.

Production numbers
Sources do not precisely agree on the total numbers of CCKWs built by the end of production in 1945. Ware (2010) lists one single number of 562,750 of CCKW trucks, built across all variants—presumably including the amphibian DUKW. More clearly specified numbers are provided by Sunderlin in Army Motors magazine, and by Jackson, using the numbers found in the 1946 revision of the U.S. military's Summary Report of Acceptances, Tank-Automotive Materiel. Sunderlin reports a total of 528,829 of -ton 6×6 units (excluding the DUKW) produced by GMC—versus a total of 527,168 accepted by the U.S. Army. Jackson's tabulation of the 1946 U.S. acceptances numbers adds up to 524,873 units, excluding the DUKWs and the ACKWX predecessor models. Both of these numbers still include the cab-over engine AFKWX-353 models—leaving a total of some 518,000–519,000 actual CCKW-352 and CCKW-353 units. In addition, GMC serial numbers indicate a production of 23,500 of the same bodied 6x4 CCW models, versus 23,649 units accepted by U.S. ordnance.

In any case, GM / GMC built a total of -ton, 6-wheeled trucks that was second only to the WW II "Jeep" —and neither Ford nor Willys individually built as many jeeps during the war.

Specifications

Engine and drive-line
A  bore by  stroke gave a  displacement. This (gasoline) engine was designed for commercial trucks, and was reliable in service.

The transmission was a Warner T93 5-speed with a direct 4th gear and overdrive 5th gear. The transfer case had high and low gears, and engaged the front axle. Originally all axles were a Timken split type, later trucks also used GM "banjo" types.

Chassis
The CCKW had a ladder frame chassis with three driven beam axles, the front on leaf springs, the rear tandem on leaf springs with locating arms. There were two wheelbases, the short Model 352 and the long Model 353. The short,  (Measurements are from the centerline of the front axle to the centerline of rear bogie) was used with a short cargo bed as an artillery prime mover for 75 mm and 105 mm howitzers. All other models used the long  wheelbase. Tires were 7.50-20, brakes were hydraulic with vacuum assist.

Some were fitted with  front-mounted winches.

Some open cab chassis were cut in half behind the cab for air transport. Each half was a load, at the vehicle's destination, the halves were bolted back together.

Versions

Initially, all versions used a modified commercial closed cab design having a metal roof and doors. By 1944 an open cab version, with a canvas roof and doors, was used. This was easier to build, and the roof could be removed to lower the shipping height. 1 in 4 of cabs had a machine gun mounting ring above the co-driver's position.

The CCKW provided a platform for the widest range of bodies on any U.S. military vehicle, with the  cargo version being the most common. As steel was more heavily rationed during the course of the war, the steel cargo bed was replaced by a wooden one. Wooden beds proved unsatisfactory and a 'composite' bed with steel sides, framing, and wooden bottom slats was developed. However, the composite bed was still unsatisfactory and the bed design returned to all steel. Standard cargo models had beds with fixed sides and a drop tailgate, as well as folding troop seats.

A standard rectangular van configuration was used in communications, medical, workshop, and many other specialty roles. Special built vans were also used.

Specialized variants
Many specialized variants of the basic 6×6 CCKW were made, some in small numbers, including some converted in the field. These include:
Air compressor
Bomb service
Chemical decontaminating
Chemical handling 
Dental operating van
Dump truck
Fire engine
Fuel & gas tankers
Fuel & oil handling,
High lift
K-53 radio equip. van
K-60 radio equip. van
Map reproduction van
Ordnance maintenance van
Pipeline equipment
Ponton bolster
Semi-trailer tractor
Shop equipment GP repair van
Surgical van
Water purification van
Water tanker
Welder's truck

ACK-353
The ACK-353 (A for 1939 design, C for conventional cab, and K for all wheel drive) -ton 4×4 truck was the smaller brother of the ACKWX, and a predecessor to the Chevrolet G506, competing with the Dodge / Fargo T-203 / VF-400 series, as GM was at that time also trying to clinch the lucrative contract for the standard World War II cargo trucks in the -ton 4×4 category.

The ACK-353 was equipped with the new for 1939 GMC 248 engine, an overhead valve, low-deck inline-six with a  bore and  stroke, resulting in a  displacement, producing  (net). Transmission was four-speed manual, combined with a two-speed transfer-case engaging the front axle for all-wheel drive operation.

A special feature were the front hubs, designed to take dual wheels in especially challenging terrain.

Fitted with steel GS bodies with fixed sides and troop seats, the trucks were originally ordered under French contract, but ended up in use by the British Army, although some 2,000 units delivered to the French in early 1940 were used from June 1940 to reequip the infantry of the light mechanized divisions whose equipment had been lost at Dunkirk. Some were kept in service by the Armistice Army and others likely fell into the hands of the Nazi Germany Wehrmacht.

ACKWX-353
The ACKWX-353 (A for 1939 design, C for conventional cab, K for all wheel drive, W for tandem rear axles, and X for non-standard chassis) three-ton 6x6 truck was the direct predecessor from which the CCKW was developed.

Some 1,000 of the 3-ton 6x6 trucks were originally contracted by France, butjust like the 4×4 ACK trucksafter the defeat of the French, diverted to Britain in 1940. The British however, deemed the trucks unfavorable for use in the war, due to their long wheelbase and lacking power, and diverted them to Russia in turn, in 1941. A total of 2,466 ACKWX trucks were built — both according to GMC's serial numbers, as well as the U.S. Army's acceptance figures.

AFKWX-353

The AFKWX (A for 1939 design, F for forward cab, K for all wheel drive, W for tandem rear axles, and X for non-standard chassis) 353, a cab over engine, long cargo bed version of the CCKW, went into production alongside it in 1942 at Yellow's Pontiac plant and Chevrolet's in St. Louis. Only the first 50 units produced had closed cabs, all others were open. None had a front-mounted winch. The cab over design made engine maintenance difficult. As a result, only 7,235 were built, – 2,232 units with the  body, and 5,000 of the  version.

CCW-353

The CCW-353 (C for 1941 design, C for conventional cab, and W for tandem rear axles) was a near identical version of the CCKW-353, that lacked its front-wheel drive, resulting in an officially purely on-road, and therefore 5-ton rated, 6×4 version of the same truck. A beam front axle was used, with the transfer case locked in high range. Of the ~118,000 -ton, 6x4 trucks the U.S. built in WW II, GMC contributed 23,649 units of the CCW-353 as standard cargo trucks without winch – almost all of them built in 1942.

DUKW

The DUKW (D for 1942 design, U for utility, K for all wheel drive, and W for tandem rear axles) — popularly the "Duck" – was an amphibious truck that shared the CCKW's driveline, but had a totally different body and structure than all the other trucks. First produced at Yellow's Pontiac plant, as demand increased production was added to Chevrolet's St. Louis plant. The hull, designed by an America's Cup winner, gave the truck respectable sea-keeping capability. A very successful design, 21,147 were built.

Gallery

See also

2-ton, 6×6 truck (U.S. Army)
DUKW 2-ton, 6x6, amphibious truck
Chevrolet G506 1-ton, 4×4 truck
M35  ton cargo truck
Studebaker US6 -ton 6×6 truck
List of U.S. military vehicles by supply catalog designation / G-508
List of U.S. military vehicles by model number
List of U.S. Signal Corps Vehicles
Red Ball Express

Notes

References

External links

http://www.cckw.org/
https://web.archive.org/web/20081028220440/http://www.transchool.eustis.army.mil/Museum/ExhibitsIndex.htm
CCKW at Olive-Drab.com

GMC CCKW at U.S. Veterans Memorial Museum

Military trucks of the United States
CCKW
Soft-skinned vehicles
World War II military vehicles
World War II vehicles of the United States
Motor vehicles manufactured in the United States
Military vehicles introduced from 1940 to 1944
Six-wheeled vehicles